Rewa Division is an administrative geographical unit of Madhya Pradesh state of India situated in the northeast part of state bordering with Uttar Pradesh, Chhattisgarh and Baghelkhand region of Madhya Pradesh.  Rewa is the administrative headquarters of the division. As of 2010, the division consists of districts of Rewa, Satna, Sidhi, and Singrauli district. The division forms a part of the Baghelkhand region of Madhya Pradesh.
The divisional headquarters in the Kothi Compound area of Rewa.

External links
Official Government Website of Rewa
Rewa City, Complete Information about Rewa City
First Local Search Engine of Rewa
Official website of Maharaja, Rewa (M.P.)
Genealogy of the ruling chiefs of Rewa
RewaCityOnline, All Important Information about Rewa City
Population information on Rewa
Rewa District Government Contacts
Rewa road map
Rewa district map

References

Divisions of Madhya Pradesh